Martti Henrikki Haavio (22 January 1899 –  4 February 1973) was a Finnish poet, folklorist and mythologist, writing poetry under the pen name P. Mustapää. He was born on 22 January 1899 in Temmes, and died 4 February 1973 in Helsinki. He was also a professor of folklore and an influential researcher of Finnish mythology. In 1960, Haavio married Aale Tynni, after his first wife Elsa Enäjärvi-Haavio died in 1951 of cancer. His daughter, Elina Haavio-Mannila, is a social scientist. During Haavio's early career, he was a member of the Tulenkantajat literature club.

He is buried in the Hietaniemi Cemetery in Helsinki.

Folkloristical and mythological works 
 Suomalaisen muinaisrunouden maailma. Porvoo: WSOY, 1935.
 Suomalaiset kodinhaltiat. Porvoo: WSOY, 1942.
 Viimeiset runonlaulajat. Third edition (second edition 1948). Porvoo: WSOY, 1985. .
 Piispa Henrik ja Lalli: Piispa Henrikin surmavirren historiaa. Porvoo: WSOY, 1948.
 Sampo-eepos: Typologinen analyysi. A doctoral dissertation. Suomalais-ugrilaisen seuran toimituksia 96. Helsinki: Suomalais-ugrilainen seura, 1949.
 Väinämöinen: Suomalaisten runojen keskushahmo. Porvoo: WSOY, 1950.
 Kansanrunojen maailmanselitys. Helsinki Porvoo: WSOY, 1955.
 Karjalan jumalat: Uskontotieteellinen tutkimus. Porvoo: WSOY, 1959.
 Kuolematonten lehdot: Sämpsöi Pellervoisen arvoitus. Porvoo: WSOY, 1961.
 Bjarmien vallan kukoistus ja tuho: Historiaa ja runoutta. Porvoo Helsinki: WSOY, 1965.
 Suomalainen mytologia. Porvoo Helsinki: WSOY, 1967.
 Esseitä kansanrunoudesta. Articles published 1959 in Essais folkloriques par Martti Haavio. Studia Fennica 8. Suomalaisen Kirjallisuuden Seuran toimituksia 564. Helsinki: Suomalaisen Kirjallisuuden Seura, 1992. .

Poetic works 
 Laulu ihanista silmistä (1925)
 Laulu vaakalinnusta, (1927)
 Jäähyväiset Arkadialle (1945)
 Koiruoho, ruusunkukka (1947)
 Linnustaja (1952)
 Tuuli Airistolta (1969)

References

External links

 Haavio at YLE
 
 Läntisen Uudenmaan kirjailijoita 
 Martti Haavio in 375 humanists 23.02.2015, Faculty of Arts, University of Helsinki

1899 births
1973 deaths
People from North Ostrobothnia
People from Oulu Province (Grand Duchy of Finland)
Writers from Northern Ostrobothnia
Finnish male poets
Finnish folklorists
Finnish military personnel of World War II
20th-century Finnish poets
Burials at Hietaniemi Cemetery
20th-century male writers